Bhawaiya is a musical form or a popular folk music in Northern Bangladesh, especially Rangpur District and in Cooch Behar, Jalpaiguri, part of Darjeeling and North Dinajpur district of West Bengal and Dhubri and Goalpara of Assam in India. These area were covered by Kamtapur state and so for the song also Kamtapuri language is used. This folk song is sung traditionally both solo and by chorus. The following is a list of Bhawaiya singers from Bangladesh and West Bengal:

Momtaz Begum
Abdul Alim
Farida Parveen
Kanak Chapa
Kasim Uddin
Abbas Uddin
Mustafa Zaman Abbasi
Ferdausi Begum
Rathindranath Roy
From Assam:
Pratima Barua Pandey
Zubeen Garg
Papon
From West Bengal 
Saurav Moni

References 

Indian folk music
Bengali folk songs
Lists of musicians by genre